Lower Sauratown Plantation includes the remnants of a historic plantation and archaeological site located near Eden, Rockingham County, North Carolina. The plantation remnants include a plantation office building (c. 1825), a mid-19th century brick dwelling house, the Brodnax family cemetery, the remains of an extensive boxwood garden, and numerous below-grade foundations.  The office and dwelling house were restored in 1983. Site 31RK1 is located on the Lower Sauratown Plantation and includes the remains of a large 17th-century Indian village of the Saura tribe.  Lower Sauratown Plantation was the boyhood home of Governor Robert Broadnax Glenn, the adopted son of Dr. Edward T. Brodnax.

It was listed on the National Register of Historic Places in 1984.

References

Plantation houses in North Carolina
Farms on the National Register of Historic Places in North Carolina
Archaeological sites on the National Register of Historic Places in North Carolina
Buildings and structures completed in 1825
Houses in Rockingham County, North Carolina
National Register of Historic Places in Rockingham County, North Carolina